Michel D'Hooghe (19 February 1912 – 12 May 1940) was a Belgian racing cyclist. He won the Tour of Flanders in 1937. He was killed in action during World War II.

References

External links

1912 births
1940 deaths
Belgian male cyclists
People from Zele
Cyclists from East Flanders
Belgian civilians killed in World War II
Deaths by airstrike during World War II